Harri Porten (born 1972) is  a software engineer. Porten, a KDE developer and former Trolltech employee, is the CEO of Froglogic, a consultancy company related to Qt development. He lives in Hamburg, Germany.

Porten originally wrote the KJS JavaScript engine for Konqueror, the KDE project's file manager and web browser. KJS was eventually used by Apple as the basis for JavaScriptCore. He also contributed to the development of KPPP, the KDE project's Internet dialer.

Porten took part  in the development of Qt, a GUI toolkit used by Windows, macOS, and X11 developers.

His company Froglogic is known for Squish, a professional cross-platform automated GUI testing framework for applications written using Qt.

References

External links 

 "People behind KDE" Interview from February 26th 2001
 photo of Harri, from same interview

Porten, Harri
Porten, Harri
KDE
German software engineers
Free software programmers
German computer scientists
20th-century German engineers
21st-century German engineers
Engineers from Hamburg